Tionadara Creek is a creek that converges with the West Branch Unadilla River in Bridgewater, New York.

References

Rivers of New York (state)
Rivers of Oneida County, New York